Bernie Clayton Papy Sr. (May 27, 1902 – August 10, 1964) was an American politician from Key West, Florida. He served in the Florida House of Representatives from 1935 until 1962, representing Key West. Papy ran for office again in 1964, winning the primaries, but died in a Miami hospital following lung cancer surgery before contesting the general elections. Bernie Papy Jr. was his son.

See also
Mariano D. Papy

Further reading 
 
 (Fictionalized) Papy features in 2013-15 suspense/crime "Key West" book series by Peter Wick, also featuring Miami Herald columnist, Stephen Trumbull

References

Members of the Florida House of Representatives
People from Key West, Florida
1902 births
1964 deaths
20th-century American politicians
Deaths from lung cancer